"La Escalera" is a song recorded by Spanish singer-songwriter Pablo Alborán. It was released as the fourth and final single from his third studio album, Terral on 28 October 2015.

Music video
The music video for "La Escalera" was released on the same day. It stars Spanish actors Berta Herández and Adridane Ramirez and four figures of the Spanish National Ballet (Luciana Croatto, Kayoko Everahrt, Reyes ortega and Sara Fernandez Gómez).

Chart performance

Release history

References

2015 singles
Pablo Alborán songs
2014 songs
Warner Music Group singles
Songs written by Pablo Alborán